The 2008 Saint Francis Cougars football team represented the University of Saint Francis, located in Fort Wayne, Indiana, in the 2008 NAIA football season. They were led by head coach Kevin Donley, who served his 11th year as the first and only head coach in the history of Saint Francis football.  The Cougars played their home games at Bishop John D'Arcy Stadium and were members of the Mid-States Football Association (MSFA) Mideast League (MEL). The Cougars finished in 1st place in the MSFA MEL division, so they received an automatic bid to the 2008 postseason NAIA playoffs.

Schedule 
(12-1 overall, 6-0 conference)
After an undefeated regular season, USF finished with a loss at Sioux Falls.  This was the second time in three seasons that Sioux Falls put the only blemish on the USF record.

Ranking movements

References

Saint Francis
Saint Francis Cougars football seasons
Saint Francis Cougars football